Didi Longuet (born 9 March 1981) is a Dutch former professional footballer who played as a right-back.

Football career
Longuet started playing youth football with SC Voorland before moving to the youth academy of Ajax in 1994. He made his professional debut in 2001 during a loan at Haarlem. Longuet then played for RKC Waalwijk between 2004 and 2006, where he made his debut in the Eredivisie. Afterwards, he played for Dordrecht for five years, making over 100 appearances for the club. A season at Volendam followed, where he did not make an appearance. Longuet retired as part of amateur club JOS Watergraafsmeer, whom he had joined in July 2012.

A youth international for the Netherlands, Longuet gained one cap for the Netherlands U19 team in 1999.

References

1981 births
Living people
Association football defenders
Dutch footballers
Eredivisie players
Footballers from Amsterdam
RKC Waalwijk players
Jong Ajax players
HFC Haarlem players
FC Dordrecht players
FC Volendam players
JOS Watergraafsmeer players
Eerste Divisie players
Netherlands youth international footballers